Porto Buono is a decorative stone from Porto Venere, near Spezia, Liguria, Italy. A cretaceous golden veined black marble.

See also
List of stone

Limestone
Stone (material)